Andrew McNee (born 11 December 1979) is an Australian short track speed skater. He competed in two events at the 2002 Winter Olympics.

References

External links
 

1979 births
Living people
Australian male short track speed skaters
Olympic short track speed skaters of Australia
Short track speed skaters at the 2002 Winter Olympics
Sportspeople from Adelaide